USS Marpessa (SP-787) was a 50 foot (15.24 m) "express yacht" that became a United States Navy section patrol vessel in commission from 1917 to 1919 retaining the civilian name.

Marpessa was designed by T. B. Taylor for William John Matheson of New York built by the Mathis Yacht Building Company at Camden, New Jersey as hull number 60 in 1916 and, upon registration, was assigned official number 214285. Matheson had an estate at Coconut Grove, Florida and entered Marpessa, powered by two six cylinder 175 horsepower Van Blercks gasoline engines, in racing events, particularly the annual Miami regattas in January involving power boats brought from the north as well as boats based in the Miami area. The boat was badly damaged when a hired captain, over the owner's objection, held course after finding himself inside the buoy and struck a reef off Matinicock point near Oyster Bay.

On 18 August 1917, the U.S. Navy acquired her from her owner for use as a section patrol boat during World War I. She was enrolled in the Naval Coast Defense Reserve on 8 September 1917 and commissioned as USS Marpessa (SP-787) on 1 October 1917. By August 1917 three of Matheson's yachts were in government service: Marpessa, Calabash, and Coco.
 
Assigned to the 7th Naval District and based at Marathon, Florida, Marpessa patrolled the southern Atlantic coast of Florida for the rest of World War I.

Marpessa was returned to Matheson on 7 January 1919.

Footnotes

References

External links
Marpessa interior & exterior photographs, Power Boating, November 1916.
Yachts on W.J. Matheson's estate 
SP-787 Marpessa at Department of the Navy Naval History and Heritage Command Online Library of Selected Images: U.S. Navy Ships -- Listed by Hull Number "SP" #s and "ID" #s -- World War I Era Patrol Vessels and other Acquired Ships and Craft numbered from SP-700 through SP-799
NavSource Online: Section Patrol Craft Photo Archive Marpessa (SP 787)

Patrol vessels of the United States Navy
World War I patrol vessels of the United States
Ships built by the Mathis Yacht Building Company
1916 ships